The Soyuz TMA-14 (Union TMA-14) was a Soyuz flight to the International Space Station, which launched on 26 March 2009. It transported two members of the Expedition 19 crew as well as spaceflight participant Charles Simonyi on his second self-funded flight to the space station. TMA-14 was the 101st crewed flight of a Soyuz spacecraft, including launch failures; however, it was the 100th to launch and land crewed, as Soyuz 34 was launched uncrewed to replace Soyuz 32, which landed empty.

Crew

Backup crew

Mission highlights 

Soyuz TMA-14 was docked to the space station for the remainder of the Expedition 20 increment to serve as an emergency escape vehicle. The spacecraft swapped its docking ports at the International Space Station from Zvezda SM aft port to Pirs DC nadir port on 2 July 2009. This allowed Progress 34P to dock at the SM aft port on 29 July 2009.

Soyuz TMA-14 undocked and landed safely on 11 October 2009. On board for the return flight was the space tourist Guy Laliberté. Laliberté was launched with Expedition 21 on Soyuz TMA-16. He is the first Canadian space tourist.

Logo contest 

Roskosmos, in cooperation with other nations' space programs, invited children ages 6 to 15 to design and submit a patch for Soyuz TMA-14 from October 25, 2008 through December 25, 2008. On December 29, 2008, Roscosmos hosted a ceremony to announce the winners. Anna Chibiskova, 12, from Moscow was chosen for first place and her artwork was incorporated into the design of the official Soyuz TMA-14 crew patch. Kaitlin Riley, 12, from New York, U.S., and Stanislav Pyatkin, 11, from Uglegorsk, Russia, were selected as the second and third-place winners respectively by TMA-14 crew mates Gennady Padalka and Michael Barrett. A fourth winner, Roma Kuznetsov, 7, from Kazakhstan, was further selected by Roscosmos director Anatoly Perimov. All four were invited to the launch of Soyuz TMA-14 with expenses paid by the Russian Insurance Center.

References 

Crewed Soyuz missions
Spacecraft launched in 2009
Orbital space tourism missions
Spacecraft which reentered in 2009
Spacecraft launched by Soyuz-FG rockets